Brigadier Sir John George Smyth, 1st Baronet,  (24 October 1893 – 26 April 1983), often known as Jackie Smyth, was a British Indian Army officer and a Conservative Member of Parliament. Although a recipient of the Victoria Cross, his military career ended in controversy.

Early life and education

Smyth was born in 1893 in Teignmouth, Devon, the son of William John Smyth (1869–1893), a member of the Indian Civil Service, and Lilian May Clifford. His grandfather was Army officer Henry Smyth, who was the second son of John Henry Smyth (1780–1822), of Heath Hall, Wakefield, Yorkshire, a Whig MP for Cambridge University (1812–1822) and Lady Elizabeth Anne FitzRoy, daughter of George FitzRoy, 4th Duke of Grafton. His great-uncle John George Smyth was an MP for the City of York.

Smyth was educated at Dragon School, Repton, and the Royal Military College, Sandhurst.

Military career

After passing out from Sandhurst, Smyth was commissioned as a second lieutenant on the unattached list for the British Indian Army on 24 August 1912, and was commissioned into the 15th Ludhiana Sikhs on 5 November 1913. He was promoted to lieutenant on 24 November 1914, three months after the outbreak of the First World War.

He was 21 years old, and a lieutenant in the 15th Ludhiana Sikhs, 3rd (Lahore) Division, Indian Army during the First World War, when his actions earned him the Victoria Cross (VC). In June 1915, Smyth was awarded the VC, the United Kingdom's highest award for bravery in combat. The citation for this award, published in the London Gazette read:

As well as Smyth's VC, the Indian Distinguished Service Medal was posthumously awarded to the men killed during this incident. Smyth was also awarded the Russian Order of St. George, Fourth Class, in 1915, and was promoted to captain on 24 August 1916.

Smyth continued his war service in Egypt and on the North-West Frontier.

Between the wars
In September 1920, when brigade major of the 43rd Indian Brigade, Smyth was awarded the Military Cross (MC) for distinguished service in the field in Waziristan. The citation for this award, published in the London Gazette, read:

In 1923, while serving in India, Smyth played two first-class cricket matches for the Europeans team.

Returning to England, he attended the Staff College, Camberley from 1923 to 1924, and his fellow students included numerous men who would later achieve high command, including Arthur Percival, Dudley Johnson (a fellow VC recipient), Arthur Wakely, Colville Wemyss, Montagu Stopford, John Halsted, Frederick Pile, Gordon Macready, Roderic Petre, Alastair MacDougall, Edmond Schreiber, Michael Gambier-Parry, Richard Dewing, Leslie Hill, Kenneth Loch, Douglas Pratt, Balfour Hutchison, Robert Pargiter, Robert Stone and Henry Verschoyle-Campbell along with Horace Robertson of the Australian Army and Harry Crerar and Georges Vanier of the Canadian Army. Smyth received a brevet promotion to major on 1 January 1928, receiving the substantive promotion to major on 24 August 1929. By this time, he was a General Staff Officer Grade 3 (GSO3) with the 3rd Battalion, 11th Sikh Regiment, an appointment he vacated on 22 November 1929. An early appointment as the Indian Army instructor at the Staff College, Camberley in 1930 further indicated that Smyth's career was on the fast track, borne out by his appointment as a GSO2 at the Staff College on 16 January 1931, with the local rank of lieutenant colonel. He received a brevet promotion to lieutenant colonel on 1 July 1933, and relinquished his appointment at the Staff College on 16 January 1934.

On 16 July 1936, Smyth was promoted to the substantive rank of lieutenant colonel, an illustration of how rapidly his career had thus far progressed. He managed to persuade General Lord Gort, then the Chief of the Imperial General Staff (CIGS) and a former instructor at the Staff College in the mid-1920s, as well as being another fellow VC recipient, to give him an undertaking that he would be given a brigade to command in the United Kingdom should hostilities break out.

Second World War
Having managed to engineer leave from India to the United Kingdom in the summer of 1939, shortly before the outbreak of the Second World War, he called in his debt but was disappointed to be seconded to a United Kingdom-based staff job, as GSO1 of the 2nd London Division, a second-line Territorial Army (TA) formation, then commanded by Major General Harry Willans, which had only recently been formed.

In February 1940, after further lobbying, Smyth was appointed to command the 127th Infantry Brigade. His brigade major was Charles Phibbs Jones, later to become a full general. The brigade was one of three which formed part of the 42nd (East Lancashire) Infantry Division, another TA formation, then commanded by Major General William Holmes, which from April he led in France as part of the British Expeditionary Force (BEF). After the evacuation from Dunkirk in late May, he continued to command the brigade in Britain until he was summoned to return to India in March 1941. He was promoted to colonel on 23 December 1940.

After briefly commanding 36th Indian Infantry Brigade in Quetta and a period of sick leave, Smyth took command of 19th Indian Infantry Division as an acting major general in October, but was reassigned to command 17th Indian Infantry Division in December. Controversy surrounds his handling of the 17th Indian Division in February 1942, during its retreat across the Sittang River in Burma. It was said that he failed to expedite a strong bridgehead on the enemy's side of the river and was forced, when it came under threat from the Japanese, to order the blowing of the bridge while two-thirds of his division were still on the far side with no other means of crossing the river and therefore dooming them. Seventeen Division were the only formation standing between the Japanese and Rangoon, and this loss, therefore, led directly to the loss of Rangoon and Lower Burma. The Commander-in-Chief, India, General Sir Archibald Wavell was furious and sacked Smyth on the spot.

There is also a degree of controversy about Smyth's behaviour as regards his health in this period. He had not recovered from surgery for an anal fistula, which must have caused him significant, and possibly distracting, discomfort, yet managed to be recommended as fit to stay in command by a medical board presided over by the senior doctor in his own division.

Smyth received no further posts and returned to the United Kingdom to retire with the substantive rank of colonel and the honorary rank of brigadier. It took 16 years and revision of the official history before his version of the affair versus that of General Hutton, his corps commander, was clarified. Smyth's book, Milestones, 1979, gives his version in which he relates that he had made representations to General Hutton 10 days previously recommending a withdrawal to the west bank of the Sittang River, thus permitting a strong defence line to be established. His recommendation was refused.

Postwar career
Smyth went into politics and stood unsuccessfully against Ernest Bevin in Wandsworth Central at the 1945 general election. At the 1950 election, he defeated the sitting Labour MP for Norwood. He was made a baronet on 23 January 1956 with the style Sir John George Smyth, VC, MC, 1st Baronet Smyth of Teignmouth in the County of Devon and a privy counsellor in 1962. He retired from Parliament at the 1966 general election; as of 2015, he was the last VC recipient to sit in the Commons.

Smyth was also an author, a playwright, a journalist and a broadcaster. His two brothers were distinguished soldiers, one of whom also became a brigadier. He married twice: firstly Margaret Dundas on 22 July 1920, later dissolved, with whom he had three sons and a daughter; and then Frances Chambers on 12 April 1940. One of his sons, Captain John Lawrence Smyth of the 1st Battalion, Queen's Royal Regiment (West Surrey), was killed on 7 May 1944, during the first attack on Jail Hill at the Battle of Kohima.

Smyth was cremated at Golders Green Crematorium. His Victoria Cross is displayed at the Imperial War Museum.

One of Brigadier Smyth's uniforms is on display at the armoury of the Artillery Company of Newport in Newport, Rhode Island, USA.

Smyth was a cat lover and wrote three books on cats, Beloved Cats (Frederick Muller, 1963), Blue Magnolia (Frederick Muller, 1964) and Ming: The Story of a Cat Family (Frederick Muller, 1966).

Footnotes

References
Monuments to Courage (David Harvey, 1999)

The Register of the Victoria Cross (This England, 1997)
Scotland's Forgotten Valour (Graham Ross, 1995)
VCs of the First World War - The Western Front 1915 (Peter F. Batchelor & Christopher Matson, 1999)

Bibliography
Leadership in War, 1939–45; Generals in Victory and Defeat
Leadership in battle 1914–1918 : commanders in action
Story of the George Cross
The Game's the Same
Victoria Cross 1856–1964
The Only Enemy
Paradise Island
Trouble in Paradise
Ann Goes Hunting (Max Parrish, 1960)
Beloved Cats (Frederick Muller, 1963)
Blue Magnolia (Frederick Muller, 1964)
The Rebellious Rani (Frederick Muller, 1966)
Ming: The Story of a Cat Family (Frederick Muller, 1966)

External links
Outline of his career
Location of grave and VC medal (Golders Green)
Cricinfo: Brigadier Sir John Smyth

Generals of World War II

|-

|-

1893 births
1983 deaths
Baronets in the Baronetage of the United Kingdom
Indian Army personnel of World War I
Indian Army generals of World War II
British World War I recipients of the Victoria Cross
Conservative Party (UK) MPs for English constituencies
Members of the Privy Council of the United Kingdom
People educated at The Dragon School
People educated at Repton School
Graduates of the Royal Military College, Sandhurst
Recipients of the Military Cross
English cricketers
Europeans cricketers
UK MPs 1950–1951
UK MPs 1951–1955
UK MPs 1955–1959
UK MPs 1959–1964
UK MPs 1964–1966
British Indian Army officers
People from Teignmouth
British military personnel of the Second Mohmand Campaign
British military personnel of the Third Anglo-Afghan War
Recipients of the Cross of St. George
British military personnel of the Waziristan Campaign
Graduates of the Staff College, Camberley
Ministers in the third Churchill government, 1951–1955
Ministers in the Eden government, 1955–1957
Academics of the Staff College, Camberley
Military personnel from Devon
Indian Army personnel of World War II